The BMW Ljubljana Open is a professional tennis tournament played on outdoor red clay courts. It is currently part of the Association of Tennis Professionals (ATP) Challenger Tour. It is held annually in Ljubljana, Slovenia (former Yugoslavia), since 1990.

Past finals

Singles

Doubles

External links
Site about Slovenian Tennis
ITF Search

ATP Challenger Tour
Clay court tennis tournaments
Tennis tournaments in Slovenia
Sport in Ljubljana
Recurring sporting events established in 1990
1990 establishments in Yugoslavia